André Sanglier (10 May 1911, Saint-Pierre, Réunion – 22 October 1997) was a French politician. He represented the Rally of Left Republicans (RGR) in the National Assembly from 1956 to 1959.

References

1911 births
1997 deaths
People from Saint-Pierre, Réunion
Politicians of Réunion
Rally of Left Republicans politicians
Deputies of the 3rd National Assembly of the French Fourth Republic
Deputies of the 1st National Assembly of the French Fifth Republic